Salvador is a 1983 book-length essay by Joan Didion on American involvement in El Salvador. Didion wrote the book after visiting the country. Didion spent two weeks in El Salvador and has referred to the experience as "terrifying". She was in the country during the 1982 El Salvador earthquake.

The New York Review of Books published two "extended articles" by Didion about her visit to El Salvador which were later combined to form Salvador.

References

External links
 
 Book page on the official website

1983 non-fiction books
Books by Joan Didion
1983 essays
Chatto & Windus books
Simon & Schuster books
Essays about politics
Works about El Salvador
Salvadoran Civil War
Books about foreign relations of the United States